Free is the third studio album by Australian recording artist Cody Simpson, released in 2015 on Coast House Records (Simpson's personal label) and Bananabeat Records. The album, which represents Simpson's first independent release after leaving Atlantic Records, includes the singles "New Problems" and "Flower". Simpson chose the album title to reflect his desire to make the kind of music he wanted without pressure from outside sources.

Track listing

Charts

References

External links

Himg Flower
Agc New Problems

2015 albums
Cody Simpson albums
Rock albums by Australian artists